is the last Super Famicom release of the original Super Formation Soccer video game. It was released exclusively in Japan in 1996.

This game featured 18 fictitious club teams from around the world, based on well-known teams of the time. The players names are also fictitious; for example, J. V. Pinto is spelled .

Teams
  - AC Midland (A.C. Milan), FC Arara (Parma F.C.), Youth Endless (Juventus)
  - Boss Dollarland (Borussia Dortmund), Balloon Munich (Bayern Munich)
  - FC Garcenyola (FC Barcelona), Real Madonna (Real Madrid)
  - Yon Charmant (Paris Saint-Germain)
  - Abanaxs (AFC Ajax)
  - Manchester Knights (Manchester United), Black Barth (Blackburn Rovers)
  - Cafe Lisbon (S.L. Benfica)
  - Grass Leisures (Rangers)
  - Tararingo (Flamengo), Doremiso (Grêmio Porto Alegre)
  - More Seniors (Boca Juniors), Level Great (River Plate)
  - Jaldi (Verdy Kawasaki)

References

External links
Soundtrack information at SNESmusic
Teams (Instruction manual) at Giant Bomb
Teams information (page 1) 
Teams information (page 2) 

1996 video games
Association football video games
Human Entertainment games
Japan-exclusive video games
Super Nintendo Entertainment System games
Super Nintendo Entertainment System-only games
Video game sequels
Video games developed in Japan
Multiplayer and single-player video games